Immortal Light is a 1951 West German drama film directed by Arthur Maria Rabenalt and starring Rudolf Forster, Cornell Borchers and Volker von Collande. It was shot at the Bavaria Studios in Munich. The film's sets were designed by the art directors Willi A. Herrmann and Heinrich Weidemann.

Cast

References

Bibliography

External links 
 

1951 films
1951 drama films
German drama films
West German films
1950s German-language films
Films directed by Arthur Maria Rabenalt
Films shot at Bavaria Studios
Films scored by Ralph Benatzky
German black-and-white films
Films set in France
1950s German films